Citizens for Community Values (CCV) is a lobbying organization focused upon implementing conservative Christian sexual morality in public policy. It operates primarily in the US state of Ohio and is the Family Policy Council (a Focus on the Family affiliate organization) for that state, with branches in Indiana, Wisconsin, and Kentucky.

CCV was designated as a hate group by the Southern Poverty Law Center from 2015 to 2017 because CCV vilified LGBT people as categorically destructive to society and families.

History

1983 founding 
Citizens for Community Values was founded by Jerry Kirk in 1983
as an anti-obscenity organization. The organization's first aim was that the Cincinnati City Council would ban the Playboy Channel from local cable television. CCV opposed "the growing impact of the Playboy philosophy upon America" which members described as "the philosophy that the ultimate good is pleasure and happiness for the individual."

In the 1980s and 1990s CCV organized hundreds of people to attend city council meetings in Ohio, Kentucky, and Indiana urging city governments to outlaw pornographic movies from video stores.

1990 Mapplethorpe censorship 

CCV gained national attention for prosecuting the Contemporary Arts Center of Cincinnati in 1990; an unsuccessful attempt to censor an exhibition of photographs by Robert Mapplethorpe. Mapplethorpe's work included homoerotic images. According to Smithsonian Magazine, this was the first time in American history that a museum was taken to court on criminal charges for an exhibition. "Citizens for Community Values launched a publicity and letter-writing campaign against the show" in addition to the criminal prosecution, resulting in "thousands of letters demanding the exhibition be cancelled and that funding be pulled from the Fine Arts Fund (an umbrella campaign to raise funds for eight cultural organizations in the city)."

1991 presidency of Phil Burress 

In 1991 CCV of Ohio became officially affiliated with Focus on the Family, and the Wisconsin branch became affiliated with American Family Association.
Phil Burress, a self-described former "porn addict", became head of the organization in 1991. Saying that his addiction made him unable to safely consume pornography, Burress's wife examined pornographic movies and magazines on her husband's behalf, writing summaries for him so that he could speak about them to legislators and prosecutors.

Burress lead legislative efforts against pornographic movies available in hotel rooms, dedicating a budget of over one million dollars. CCV created a consumer website to rate hotels as "clean" or "dirty" depending on if the hotel made adult movies available. Ohio pornographer Larry Flynt, opposing CCV, commented "when you check into a hotel room and order up a movie, it doesn't have any effect on Phil Burress."

CCV also fought to remove works from libraries that Burress considered indecent, such as The Advocate and other LGBT publications.

In 2001 John Ashcroft, then United States Attorney General, agreed to a meeting with "representatives of about a dozen anti-porn groups" organized by Burress and CCV.

2004 opposition to LGBT rights 

CCV spearheaded the successful 2004 effort to make gay marriage unconstitutional in Ohio.
This ban would be challenged in 2013 by James Obergerfell of Cincinnati, leading to the court case Obergefell v. Hodges which would legalize gay marriage throughout the United States.

Community activists in 2004 sought to repeal a part of the Cincinnati city charter that prohibited the city from offering employment protection to people "because of homosexual, lesbian or bisexual orientation."
CCV opposed the repeal, which CCV head Phil Burress described as "anti-religious bias."
The repeal passed with tri-partisan support.

2007 restrictions on strip clubs 

Approximately 50 strippers, calling themselves Dancers for Democracy, showed up at the Ohio House of Representatives in 2007 to oppose restrictions on strip clubs drafted by CCV.
Charity Fickisen, a dancer who spoke at a Columbus news conference, said "This is America, where consenting adults should be able to do what they want, as long as no one is getting hurt." Most dancers are young women with children who use their wages to pay for college, according to Fickisen.

The law restricting strips clubs passed in the Ohio legislature, so Ohio strippers canvassed the streets to gather the quarter million signatures needed to put the law on hold and onto the November 2007 ballot.
CCV successfully disputed the validity of the signatures Dancers for Democracy had gathered; the referendum to undo the law did not appear on the ballot. Famous stripper Stormy Daniels was charged under this law in 2018 because she touched undercover detectives posing as customers.

Recent history 

In 2019 the Ohio House introduced a non-binding resolution backed by CCV
to declare pornography a public health hazard, saying that "the #MeToo movement has exposed how dangerous and harmful it is."

Issues 

Citizens for Community Values has described its mission as: "Seeking to eliminate all activities that debase individuals by catering to that which is obscene, pornographic, or indecent." To this end they lobby to prohibit movies, artwork, dance, and writing with sexual content, particularly if connected to homosexuality, and to prohibit publications connected to LGBT social movements.

The organization lists support of "Free Speech" as a "Core Issue for a Thriving Ohio" in spite of their extensive censorship efforts.

CCV opposes legal same-sex marriage and LGBT employment protections. They also oppose gay-straight alliances and student support groups in schools, saying that "the 'safe school' message of these organizations is nothing more than a deceptive ploy."

Board of directors
The board of directors for Citizens for Community Values of Ohio includes:
Joseph L. Trauth, Jr., CCV Chairman and senior partner at Keating Muething & Klekamp law firm in Cincinnati
Alex Tornero, Vice Chairman and Republican political consultant
Sally Alspaugh, Director of Estate Giving at Cincinnati Zoo and Botanical Garden
Ken Taylor, president of Caterpillar Inc. Ohio
Seth Morgan, Ohio politician
David Myhal, Ohio lobbyist for debt collection firms

Controversy with SPLC

The Southern Poverty Law Center (SPLC) designated CCV as a hate group in 2015 because of anti-LGBT statements on the CCV website, such as "homosexual behavior is unhealthy and destructive to the individual, to families, and thus to communities and to society as a whole." SPLC defines a hate group as an organization with "beliefs or practices that attack or malign an entire class of people, typically for their immutable characteristics." In 2017 the CCV removed the controversial statements from their website and is no longer listed by the SPLC.

References

Anti-pornography movements
Focus on the Family
Christian organizations established in 1983
American Christian political organizations
Censorship of pornography
Obscenity controversies in art
Conservative organizations in the United States